Paratrophon is a genus of sea snails, marine gastropod mollusks in the subfamily Pagodulinae of the family Muricidae, the murex snails or rock snails.

Species
Species within the genus Paratrophon include:
 Paratrophon cheesemani (Hutton, 1882)
 Paratrophon dumasi (Vélain, 1877)
 Paratrophon patens (Hombron & Jacquinot, 1854)
 Paratrophon quoyi (Reeve, 1846)
Species brought into synonymy
 Paratrophon cheesmani [sic]: synonym of Paratrophon cheesemani (Hutton, 1882)
 Paratrophon exsculptus Powell, 1933: synonym of Paratrophon cheesemani (Hutton, 1882)

References

 Ponder, W.F. (1971). A review of the New Zealand neogastropd genus Paratrophon Finlay (Mollusca: Muricidae). Journal de Conchyliologie 109: 110–118.

External links
 Finlay, H. J. (1926). A further commentary on New Zealand molluscan systematics. Transactions of the New Zealand Institute. 57: 320-485, pls 18-23
  Barco, A.; Marshall, B.; A. Houart, R.; Oliverio, M. (2015). Molecular phylogenetics of Haustrinae and Pagodulinae (Neogastropoda: Muricidae) with a focus on New Zealand species. Journal of Molluscan Studies. 81(4): 476-488

Muricidae